Robinson Ekspeditionen: 2002 (also known as Robinson Ekspeditionen: Det Endelige Opgør), was the fifth season of the Danish version of the Swedish show Expedition Robinson. It premiered on 2 September 2002 and aired until 2 December 2002. As it was initially thought to be the final season of Robinson Ekspeditionen, it was an "Allstar" version of the show. Twenty-one former contestants from past seasons were chosen to compete in this season. The first twist this season came in episode one when two players from each tribe were exiled away from the game. Whilst these players were exiled, the non-exiled players were led to believe that they had been eliminated from the game. Along with those who were initially exiled, Lasse Rungholm, Lone Hattesen, and Mette Legaard were also sent into exile in episodes one, three, and four, respectively. In episode 5, all contestants that had been exiled competed in a challenge to determine who would return to the game. As Pia Rosholm lost this challenge, she was eliminated from the game. When it came down to the final three, the public was awarded the right to eliminate one contestant; they chose to eliminate Jørgen Kløcker. Ultimately, it was Henrik Ørum who won the season over Lone Hattesen with a 9–6 jury vote.

Finishing order

Voting history

References

External links
http://www.bt.dk/underholdning/det-endelige-opgoer-laes-om-alle-deltagerne

Robinson Ekspeditionen seasons
2002 Danish television seasons